Dance hosts on cruise ships are people who fill an unpaid position on cruise ships.  They are almost exclusively gentlemen, typically between the ages of 40 and 70, who excel in social ballroom dancing.

Many cruise lines allocate cabins for dance host programs. Dance hosts are expected to socialize with passengers and dance with the female passengers, who happen to greatly outnumber male passengers on most cruises.  Dance hosts must be present nightly at dance floor locations and "work the room", offering a dance to each unescorted female passenger, while being careful to not to show favoritism.
They are also responsible for attending all ship-sponsored parties and are often asked to host tables at dinner time.  They serve as general companions, making conversation and joining in for shipboard activities and games. All the while, romance is not involved, so these gentlemen must have their wits and tact about them. Crossing another passenger's cabin threshold can result in disembarkation. The film Out to Sea, a comical interpretation of the position, is basically a guide of what not to do.

Ideal applicants come from well traveled and well educated backgrounds who find it easy to converse on a variety of subjects. It is important that hosts have polished appearances and refined, approachable manners. They must also be in good shape, as dancing, most nights, lasts for hours.
Cruise lines usually allocate one passenger cabin for two hosts and allow a placement agency to charge a small daily fee. This covers the cost of recruiting, qualifying, and booking hosts for the cruise lines' itineraries.  Qualification procedures include a background check, a dance audition with a local dance instructor or video audition, and a written biography with a photograph which can be used as an introduction and conversation starter once on board.

A host must have an inherent love for dancing and socializing and not consider his responsibilities a job, because he'd be disappointed to learn that dance hosting is not a paid position. On the other hand, he will be sailing to exciting destinations on a luxury vessel for a small fraction of the ticket price that the regular guests pay.  There are often perks associated with this position including paid airfare for some long sailings, discounts for laundry, bar tabs, and internet, and opportunities to serve as an escort for shore excursions - which means they may join in on $150+ land-based itineraries for free.

References

Ballroom dance
People in tourism
People in hospitality occupations